Capt. David McLaren Bain (10 September 1891 – 3 June 1915) was a  rugby union player.

Bain was born in Edinburgh, to William Bain and Edith Frederika McLaren Bain. Bain had captained Scotland against  in 1914.

He was killed in France in World War I, while serving with the Gordon Highlanders.

See also
 List of international rugby union players killed in action during the First World War

References

 Bath, Richard (ed.) The Scotland Rugby Miscellany (Vision Sports Publishing Ltd, 2007 )

External links
 Commonwealth War Graves database
 An entire team wiped out by the Great War (The Scotsman)

1891 births
1915 deaths
Scottish rugby union players
Scotland international rugby union players
British military personnel killed in World War I
British Army personnel of World War I
Gordon Highlanders officers
Rugby union players from Edinburgh
Oxford University RFC players